The Bayer designations A Centauri and a Centauri represent different stars. Due to technical limitations, both designations link here.

 A Centauri, HD 100673, a main sequence star
 a Centauri, V761 Centauri, a giant variable star

See also
 α Centauri, Alpha Centauri
 α1 Centauri, Alpha Centauri A (HD 128620)
 α2 Centauri, Alpha Centauri B (HD 128621)
 Alpha Centauri (disambiguation)
 1 Centauri

Centauri, a
Centaurus (constellation)